Olivia Graeve is a mechanical and aerospace engineer and Professor at University of California San Diego. She is also the Director of the CaliBaja Center for Resilient Materials and Systems at UC San Diego — a binational research institute on both sides of the California-Mexico border.

Education and early career 
Graeve was born and raised in Tijuana, the oldest of five children. She first attended Southwestern Community College for two years before transferring to the University of California San Diego, where she received her Bachelor of Science in structural engineering in 1995. There, she received mentorship from Joanna McKittrick, the second woman to join the engineering faculty at UC San Diego. She then received her doctoral degree in material science and engineering from the University of California, Davis in 2001.

Following graduate school, she was hired as an assistant professor at the University of Nevada, Reno. In 2008, she moved to New York to become an associate professor at Alfred University before returning to University of California San Diego, as a professor in the Department of Mechanical and Aerospace Engineering within the Jacobs School of Engineering.

Research 
Graeve was the first Latina engineering professor to be hired at UC San Diego. Her research program centers on the design and processing of new materials that are fit for extreme environments, such as those experienced in outer space or in nuclear reactors. Among the materials her research group works on is a type of steel, called SAM2X5-630, with record-breaking resistance to deformations due to heavy impacts. The material has an unusual chemical structure that is elastic yet incredibly strong, making it potentially useful for applications like body armor and protective encasings for satellites.

CaliBaja Center for Resilient Materials and Systems 
Graeve currently serves as the Director of the CaliBaja Center for Resilient Materials and Systems at UC San Diego. The Center was established under Graeve's direction on May 24, 2016 as a collaboration between researchers at UC San Diego and National Autonomous University of Mexico. Faculty and students from both institutions work together to develop materials that can withstand extreme temperatures and pressures, leading to innovations in the development of jet turbines and nuclear reactors. In addition, the Center is meant to advance the education and training of engineers who can work on both sides of the border.

Selected Publications 

 S. Choi, R. Vazquez-Duhalt, and O.A. Graeve, "Nonlinear charge regulation for the deposition of silica nanoparticles on polystyrene spherical surfaces," Journal of Colloid and Interface Science, 613, 747-763 (2022). https://doi.org/10.1016/j.jcis.2022.01.076
 I.-C. Cheng, J.P. Kelly, E. Novitskaya, V. Eliasson, A.M. Hodge, and O.A. Graeve, "Mechanical Properties of an Fe-based SAM2x5-630 Metallic Glass Matrix Composite with Tungsten Particle Additions," Advanced Engineering Materials, 20 [9] 1800023 (2018). https://doi.org/10.1002/adem.201800023
 G.R. Khanolkar, M.B. Rauls, J.P. Kelly, O.A. Graeve, A.M. Hodge, and V. Eliasson. Shock Wave Response of Iron-based In Situ Metallic Glass Matrix Composites. Scientific Reports, 6 (2016) 22568.
 T.Q. Phan, J.P. Kelly, M.E. Kassner, V. Eliasson, O.A. Graeve, and A.M. Hodge, “Bulk Mechanical Properties Testing of Metallic Marginal Glass Formers,” Journal of Metallurgy, 2016, 6508597 (2016). http://dx.doi.org/10.1155/2016/6508597
 J.A. Inzana, D. Olvera, S.M. Fuller, J.P. Kelly, O.A. Graeve, E.M. Schwarz, S.L. Kates, and H.A. Awad, “3D Printing of Composite Calcium Phosphate and Collagen Scaffolds for Bone Regeneration,” Biomaterials, 35 [13] 4026-4034 (2014). https://doi.org/10.1016/j.biomaterials.2014.01.064

Outreach and public service 
Graeve has been an advocate for bi-national collaboration between the U.S. and Mexico in science, technology, engineering, and mathematics (STEM) fields. She is the driving force behind the CaliBaja Education Consortium, which is a collaborative effort bringing together over 20 institutions in Baja California and UC San Diego. Faculty across these institutions collaborate on scientific research and education that serves students on both sides of the U.S.-Mexico border. For example, high school and college students can participate in a program called ENLACE, a seven-week program for students from both sides of the California-Mexico border.

Awards and honors 

 100 Most Powerful Women of Mexico, Forbes, 2017
 Fellow, American Ceramic Society, 2017
 Member, Mexican Academy of Engineering, 2016
Member, Mexican Academy of Sciences, 2020
 Tijuana Walk of Fame Inductee, 2014
 Jaime Oaxaca Award, Society of Hispanic Professional Engineers, 2011
 Karl Schwartzwalder Professional Achievement in Ceramic Engineering (PACE) Award, American Ceramic Society, 2010
 National Science Foundation CAREER Awards, 2007
 Presidential Award for Excellence in Science, Mathematics, and Engineering Mentoring, 2020

References 

Mexican scientists
American mechanical engineers
American women engineers
University of California, Davis alumni
University of California, San Diego alumni
University of California, San Diego faculty
People from Tijuana
Year of birth missing (living people)
Living people
21st-century American women
Members of the Mexican Academy of Sciences